St John's Innovation Centre (SJIC) is a business incubator in Cambridge, England. It houses a concentration of science and technology related businesses.

History
The idea for the innovation centre was first proposed by Dr Chris Johnson, who was Senior Bursar of St John's College, Cambridge, responsible for estates, investments and financial policy. The combination of his scientific background and an interest in the development of college land in Cambridge led to a visit in 1984 to universities and science parks in the US, including an innovation centre in Salt Lake City, Utah. Upon his return he convened a small group including architect Ian Purdy and Walter Herriot, a banker working with early-stage companies, to plan the St John's Innovation Centre. The publication in 1985 of The Cambridge Phenomenon: The Growth of High Technology Industry in a University Town by Segal Quince Wicksteed, demonstrated to the college that investment in this sector was likely to be successful.

St John's Innovation Park was subsequently established on a  plot of land owned by St John's College since 1534, and the Innovation Centre itself was completed in 1987. It was the first innovation centre in Europe to focus on supporting knowledge-based businesses. It is the oldest such business incubator in the United Kingdom.

Following the success of the original centre, a second phase, Dirac House was completed in July 1989, and the self-contained Jeffreys Building was completed in February 1990. Dirac House is named after Paul Dirac, Nobel Prize winner and member of St John's College, while the Jeffreys Building is named after Sir Harold Jeffreys, a fellow of St John's College. Four further buildings: St John's House, Edinburgh House, and the Vitrium and Platinum developments, were completed in 2001. The land remains the property of St John's College.

Activities

From the outset, SJIC had a remit to support knowledge-based businesses with both flexible accommodation, and onsite management that could help tenants and others to develop their businesses.

The buildings provide flexible office, workshop and laboratory accommodation, and tenants have use of shared facilities including a staffed reception area, conference and meeting rooms, and restaurant.

In addition, SJIC also provides business advice to tenant companies, and supports the wider business community by undertaking programmes in association with EEDA, the University of Cambridge and others.  The centre is also a member of the EU-funded Achieve More partnership which brings together nine partners in five European countries to foster better incubation practice and collaboration across clusters.

The innovation park has been a member of the United Kingdom Science Parks Association (UKSPA) since 1987 and United Kingdom Business Incubation (UKBI) since 1999.

SJIC also promotes technology business through its involvement with the Cambridge Enterprise Conferences. The conferences bring together successful entrepreneurs with business advisors and leading academics to offer practical advice to early-stage companies. A policy day follows the conference which aims to define areas where government policy can be used to assist business growth. The conference has traditionally been supported by a range of organisations, including Business Link and the Greater Cambridge Partnership.

Staff
David Gill is the current managing director, having taken up the post in December 2008, following the retirement of Walter Herriot OBE, who held the role for 18 years. The original director was Bill Bolton, who steered SJIC through its first three years.

Location
St John's Innovation Centre is located approximately 3 km to the north of Cambridge city centre, close to junction 33 of the A14, and around 700 metres from Cambridge Science Park.

St John's Innovation Centre is located squarely within the area known as Silicon Fen.

Cambridge Technopole
St John's Innovation Centre was the initiator of the Cambridge Technopole Group – an informal network of business support organisations operating in the Greater Cambridge region. The group aims to improve the range and quality of the business support services available, particularly for companies based on technology. Other group members include Addenbrooke's Hospital, Cambridge Network, Cambridge Science Park, ERBI and the Babraham Institute.

SJIC has been responsible for writing the annual Cambridge Technopole Reports. The 2008 report was co-authored by Walter Herriot (then-director of SJIC) and Tim Minshall, of the Institute for Manufacturing. The report is sponsored by Cambridge Network and the Gatsby Charitable Foundation.

University links
Since its foundation SJIC has developed strong links with the University of Cambridge. In 1998 and 1999, pending the award of University Challenge Funding, it assisted the Industrial Liaison Officer (ILO) of the University in working with small and medium-sized university spin-outs. Through the Anglia Enterprise Network two venture scouts were employed in the University identifying potential businesses, assisting in finding additional management and fund raising. Some 50 potential businesses were identified and passed over to the ILO for further support.

The Centre works with the Judge Business School to provide reference material for research, and assisted in the establishment of the Cambridge Entrepreneurship Centre. SJIC also helped the Cambridge University Engineering Department in the establishment of the Institute for Manufacturing.

Since 2003, SJIC has been closely involved with the i10 project, which brought together all the universities and Higher Education institutions in the East of England. SJIC's role is to assist in the development of technology transfer skills within each of the institutions, and to help identify and pursue opportunities for technology transfer.

Tenants
Although most of the centre's tenants are start-up and early-stage companies operating in a wide range of leading-edge technologies, there are some long-standing residents who have maintained offices despite expanding to other locations, both within the UK and internationally. Around 60 companies are located on the site, employing over 300 people. Over a five-year period the survival rate for companies is over 88%, compared to about 50% for other similar businesses in the Cambridge area, and 45% for businesses generally in the UK.
Unlike other innovation centres, St John's Innovation Centre is also home to a number of companies offering services to the tenants, such as marketing, accountancy, legal services etc. This was a deliberate decision in the early days of the centre, to foster a diverse business community within the building.
SJIC also offer a virtual tenancy package – the Star Service – which enables small companies to use SJIC as their business address, offers telephone, fax and post handling, and gives preferential access to meeting and conference rooms and business support services. The service has been used by numerous start-up companies prior to becoming a tenant.

Alumni
The following companies all started life in St John's Innovation Centre:

 Autonomy Corporation plc, the enterprise software company. Revenue for year ending 31 December 2008 was around £310 million ($503.2 million).
 Bioprogress, now Meldex, develops innovative biodegradable films for the pharmaceuticals market.
 Cachelogic, now Velocix, specialises in content delivery networks. It is backed by Amadeus Capital Partners, 3i plc and Pentech Ventures. Velocix has subsequently been acquired by French telecommunication firm Alcatel-Lucent
 Jagex, developers and publishers of online computer games, including RuneScape and FunOrb, played by over 200 million users.
 Jobstream Group Plc, developers of Jobstream 9, a software platform used worldwide by the offshore fiduciary industry for trust and company admin, accounting and practice management. The company was founded in 1993 and still holds an office in the St John's Innovation Centre.
 Metagenerics, part of the Generics Group, now Sagentia.
 Owlstone Nanotech, developers of a button-sized programmable chemical sensor. In March 2009 the company was awarded a contract by the United States Department of Defense valued at $1.4 Million.
 Plastic Logic, developers of a new e-Reader based on proprietary plastic electronics. Investors include Amadeus Capital Partners, Intel Capital, BASF Venture Capital, Siemens Venture Capital, Yasuda Enterprise Development, Morningside Technology Ventures, Bank of America Equity Partners, Nanotech Partners, Dow Venture Capital, Polytechnos Venture Partners, Oak Investment Partners and Raptor Capital Management.
 Red Gate Software, developers of software tools for database administrators and developers.
 Splashpower, a wireless power development company. Founded in 2001, it was acquired by Fulton Innovation in May 2008
 Symbionics, a technology development company founded in 1987 and acquired by Cadence Design Systems, Inc. in March 1998
 Technetix Group, the broadband network equipment manufacturer. The company now operates in 21 countries selling to 91 countries worldwide. Revenue for the year ending 2016 was £118.5m. Technetix
 True Knowledge, developers of an ‘Internet Answer Engine’. The company raised almost £3million in venture funding between start-up in 2006 and end 2008.
 Visual Planet, developer of through-glass touch screens. The company was a virtual tenant of SJIC.
 Zeus Technology, a software development company founded in 1995.

References

External links
 Official website
 Cambridge Technopole
 i10 project
 SJIC page on Cambridge Network
 SJIC profile on UKSPA

Business incubators of the United Kingdom
St John's
Companies established in 1987
Economy of Cambridgeshire
1987 establishments in the United Kingdom
Innovation in the United Kingdom